Sang-e Surakh (also Romanized as Sang-e Sūrākh, Sang-i-Surākh, and Sang Sūrākh; also known as Sang-e Sūrāk and Sang-e Sūrākhā) is a village in Dorungar Rural District, Now Khandan District, Dargaz County, Razavi Khorasan Province, Iran. At the 2006 census, its population was 182, in 53 families.

References 

Populated places in Dargaz County